Alexander Vasilyevich Berdnikov (born April 8, 1953) is a Russian politician, and was Head of the Altai Republic from 2006 to 2019.

He took office on January 20, 2006. He was a candidate in the December 2001 election for that position, receiving 9.6% of the vote and coming in sixth place. In 2004, a new law stopped direct elections for Russian administrative division leaders. In December 2005, Berdnikov was nominated by Vladimir Putin and confirmed by the State Assembly of the Altai Republic, succeeding Mikhail Lapshin.

His 12-year term has been plagued by multiple scandals, such as the Altaigate scandal.

References 

1953 births
Living people
People from Gorno-Altaysk
Heads of the Altai Republic
United Russia politicians
21st-century Russian politicians